Yury Karabasov (12 June 1939 – 7 December 2021) was a Russian professor and politician. A member of United Russia, he served in the State Duma from 2007 to 2011.

References

1939 births
2021 deaths
Fifth convocation members of the State Duma (Russian Federation)
Communist Party of the Soviet Union members
United Russia politicians
Politicians from Moscow